Anissimov is a Russian surname. Notable people with the surname include:

Alexander Anisimov (born 1947), Russian conductor
Ellina Anissimova (born 1992), Estonian hammer thrower
Myriam Anissimov (born 1943), French writer

See also
 Anisimov

Russian-language surnames